Denis Zanette (23 March 1970 – 10 January 2003) was an Italian professional racing cyclist. He rode in eight editions of the Giro d'Italia and made one start in the Tour de France, in 1995. He won a stage in both the 1995 and 2001 Giro d'Italia. He came third in the 2001 Tour of Flanders.

Death
Zannette died suddenly in January 2003 at Pordenone hospital after collapsing at his dentist's office in his hometown Sacile. Investigations were started to reveal if his death was doping-related, since Zanette had been mentioned on a list of riders who had allegedly been in possession of banned drugs during the 2001 Giro d'Italia where he won the 10th stage. The cause of death was later revealed as heart failure due to a probable heart disease aggravated by a neglected flu.

He was survived by his wife Manuela and daughters Anna and Paola.

Major results

1991
 2nd Piccola Sanremo
1993
 2nd Trofeo Città di San Vendemiano
1994
 1st Astico–Brenta
 1st Stage 6 Giro della Valle d'Aosta
 3rd Gran Premio di Poggiana
1995
 1st Stage 18 Giro d'Italia
 2nd Giro di Toscana
 5th Overall Four Days of Dunkirk
 10th Overall Euskal Bizikleta
1996
 1st Stage 1 Settimana Internazionale di Coppi e Bartali
 4th Overall Four Days of Dunkirk
 9th Overall Three Days of De Panne
1997
 4th Overall Three Days of De Panne
 7th GP de la Ville de Rennes
1998
 1st Stage 8 Volta a Portugal
1999
 3rd Overall Three Days of De Panne
 9th Tour of Flanders
 9th Overall Four Days of Dunkirk
2000
 1st Stage 1 Danmark Rundt
 4th Overall Regio-Tour
 4th Coppa Bernocchi
 7th Coppa Sabatini
2001
 1st Stage 10 Giro d'Italia
 3rd Tour of Flanders
2002
 3rd Millemetri del Corso di Mestre

Grand Tour general classification results timeline

References

External links
 

1970 births
2003 deaths
Italian male cyclists
People from Sacile
Cyclists from Friuli Venezia Giulia
Italian Giro d'Italia stage winners